Gamnoam is a Buddhist temple of the Jogye Order in Seoul, South Korea. Founded in 1912 it is located at 15 Chungsin-dong in the Jongno-gu  area of the city.

See also
List of Buddhist temples in Seoul

External links
koreatemple.net

Buddhist temples in Seoul
Jongno District
Buddhist temples of the Jogye Order
1912 establishments in Korea